The Moncton Golden Flames were a professional ice hockey team based in Moncton, New Brunswick, playing home games at the Moncton Coliseum. The team operated in the American Hockey League between 1984 and 1987. The new franchise was purchased by a group of 6 local business men after the previous franchise known as the Moncton Alpines moved to Halifax to become the Nova Scotia Oilers (The Alpines were a minor league affiliate of the Edmonton Oilers). The Golden Flames were the minor league affiliate of the Calgary Flames, and for their final two seasons, had an additional affiliation with the Boston Bruins. The team boasted a number of future NHL stars including Brett Hull, Joel Otto, Mike Vernon, Bill Ranford, Bob Sweeney, Gary Roberts, Lyndon Byers, Dave Reid, Brian Bradley and others. In 1987, team marketing executive Larry Haley was awarded the Ken McKenzie Award for outstanding work.

History

The New Brunswick Hawks of the American Hockey League (AHL) had been established in Moncton in 1978, and were jointly owned and operated by the Toronto Maple Leafs and Chicago Black Hawks as their farm team. In the summer of 1982, with Chicago having already pulled out of New Brunswick in favour of affiliating with the Springfield Indians on their own, the Maple Leafs announced that they would not operate the team in Moncton the following year after they couldn't come to terms with the city on a new arena lease, even though the team had the fifth-highest attendance in the league.  At the same AHL Board of Governors meeting that the franchise's relocation to become the St. Catharines Saints was approved, the Edmonton Oilers received approval to purchase a new AHL franchise to replace the departed Hawks in Moncton, leading to establishment of the Moncton Alpines as their affiliate that fall.  The team played for two seasons until 1984, coached by Doug Messier both seasons. Following 1984, the team was bought by the Calgary Flames and renamed the Moncton Golden Flames. The franchise folded in 1987, and replaced by the Winnipeg Jets' affiliate, the Moncton Hawks.

Coaches
 1984–85 – Pierre Page
 1985–86 – Terry Crisp
 1986–87 – Terry Crisp

Training staff
 1984–87 - Brian Patafie, Mike Baiani, David Lorette, Jamie Druet, Andrew Trites

Players
During the 1986–87 season, Brett Hull won the Dudley "Red" Garrett Memorial Award as the AHL's rookie of the year. Sixty-three Moncton Golden Flames players including Hull, have gone on to play in the NHL. Five players from the Golden Flames also went on to win the Stanley Cup with the 1988–89 Calgary Flames. They are, Joel Otto, Dave Reierson, Gary Roberts, Ken Sabourin and goaltender Mike Vernon.

Season-by-season results

Regular season

Playoffs

See also
List of ice hockey teams in New Brunswick

References

External links
 AHL stats

 
Ice hockey clubs established in 1984
Ice hockey clubs disestablished in 1987
Sport in Moncton
Boston Bruins minor league affiliates
Calgary Flames minor league affiliates
Edmonton Oilers minor league affiliates